The New Zealand Improv Festival is an annual improvisational theatre festival held in Wellington, New Zealand. It brings together improvisors from New Zealand, Australia and other countries through workshops and performances.

History 

The festival began in 2008 under Wellington Improvisation Troupe. It now operates under the New Zealand Improv Trust.

See also

 List of improvisational theater festivals

References

External links 

 New Zealand Improv Festival

Theatre festivals in New Zealand
Comedy festivals in New Zealand
Festivals in Wellington
Improvisational theatre